The Prix Henri de Régnier awarded by the Académie française is an annual prize to support literary creation established in 1994 by grouping of the prizes of the foundations Aubry-Vitet, Bonardi, Pierre de Régnier, Xavier Marnier, Monbinne, Pierre Villey et de Vismes. It is currently endowed with 5,000 euros, the highest sum of the prizes of the foundations.

List of laureates

External links 
 The Prix Henri de Régnier on the site of the Académie française
 Prix Henri de Régnier de l'Académie française 2016 for Une jeunesse de Blaise Pascal on Livres Hebdo
 Kirby Jambon Receives Henri de Régnier Award on Consulate General of France in New Orleans

Henri de Regnier
Awards established in 1994
1994 establishments in France